John Moreno (born 4 March 1939) is a British actor, probably best known for his role as Luigi Ferrara in the 1981 James Bond feature film For Your Eyes Only.

His other film credits include appearances in Les Misérables (1978), The Razor's Edge (1984), John Wycliffe: The Morning Star (1984) and Old Scores (1991). His television credits include Doctor Who (in the serial The Ambassadors of Death where he played Dobson),  Moonbase 3, The Duchess of Duke Street, Return of the Saint, Thriller, The Sweeney, The Enigma Files, Kessler, Farrington of the F.O., Squadron, Only Fools and Horses, Dempsey and Makepeace, Beau Geste, One by One, Lovejoy and Heartbeat. He had a recurring role in the 1971 television series Hine.

Selected filmography

Film

Television

References

External links
 
 Official Site: johnmoreno.org

British male film actors
British male television actors
Living people
1939 births
20th-century British male actors